Allary Éditions is an independent French publishing house.

History
Founded in 2013 by Guillaume Allary, a former philosophy teacher from Nancy, who worked for the Maison d'éducation de la Légion d'honneur, then Flammarion, Hachette Littératures and NiL Éditions, and publishes about fifteen of works per year. A generalist house, Allary Éditions publishes novels, essays and comics. It limits its production to about fifteen titles per year. It publishes, in each field, reference authors, able to address the greatest number of people while building a work.

Catalog 
 Riad Sattouf
L'Arabe du futur 1, Une jeunesse au Moyen-Orient (1978-1984), 2014
L'Arabe du futur 2, Une jeunesse au Moyen-Orient (1984-1985), 2015
Les Cahiers d'Esther, Histoires de mes 10 ans, 2016
L'Arabe du futur 3, Une jeunesse au Moyen-Orient (1985-1987), 2016
Les Cahiers d'Esther, Histoires de mes 11 ans, 2017
Les Cahiers d'Esther, Histoires de mes 12 ans, 2017
L'Arabe du futur 4, Une jeunesse au Moyen-Orient (1987-1992), 2018
Les Cahiers d'Esther, Histoires de mes 13 ans, 2019
Les Cahiers d'Esther, Histoires de mes 14 ans, 2020
L'Arabe du futur 5, Une jeunesse au Moyen-Orient (1992-1994), 2020
Les Cahiers d'Esther, Histoires de mes 15 ans, 2021
Matthieu Ricard
Plaidoyer pour les animaux, 2015
with Christophe André and Alexandre Jollien, Trois amis en quête de sagesse, 2016
 with Wolf Singer, Cerveau et méditation : dialogue entre le bouddhisme et les neurosciences, prefaced by Christophe André, 2017
with Tania Singer, Pouvoir et altruisme, 2018
with Christophe André and Alexandre Jollien, À nous la liberté !, 2019
with Christophe André and Alexandre Jollien, Abécédaire de la sagesse, 2020
with Ilios Kotsou, Les folles histoires du sage Nasredin, 2021
with Jason Gruhl, Nos amis les animaux, 2021. Album jeunesse.
Carnets d'un moine errant, 2021
Raphaël Glucksmann
Génération gueule de bois, 2015
Notre France, dire et aimer ce que nous sommes, 2016
Les enfants du vide, 2018
Lettre à la génération qui va tout changer, 2021
Charles Pépin
La Joie, 2015
Les Vertus de l'échec, 2016
La Confiance en soi, 2018
La Rencontre, 2021
Bernard Pivot, 
Au secours ! Les mots m'ont mangé, 2017
Amis, chers Amis, 2022
 Philippe Douroux, Alexandre Grothendieck, Sur les traces du dernier génie des mathématiques, 2016
Joude Jassouma, Laurence de Cambronne, Je viens d'Alep, Itinéraire d'un réfugié ordinaire, Paris/61-Lonrai, Allary éditions/Normandie roto impr., 2017
Michel Hazanavicius, La Classe Américaine, 2020
Lauren Bastide, Présentes, 2020
Marylène Patou-Mathis, L'homme préhistorique est aussi une femme, 2021
Caroline Michel-Aguirre, Matthieu Aron, Les Infiltrés, 2022
Alexandre Lacroix, L'art de faire l'amour, 2022

References

Allary
French brands